The Official Americana Albums Chart is a weekly music chart based on physical sales of albums in the United Kingdom. It is compiled by the Official Charts Company (OCC) on behalf of the Americana Music Association UK. The launch of the chart came at a time when Americana music was growing in popularity in the UK. In 2017, it was reported that sales of Americana albums in the UK had increased by 35 percent year-on-year.

The first chart was announced on 28 January 2016 on the Bob Harris Country show on BBC Radio 2. As part of the launch, the best selling Americana album of 2015 was also announced. This went to Swedish duo First Aid Kit with their album Stay Gold

Number ones

Best-selling albums by year
Each January, the Official Charts Company releases a summary of the previous year on the Official Americana Albums Chart, listing the top ten best-selling albums of that year, including the best-selling album overall and the best-selling album by a homegrown artist.

References 

British record charts
2016 establishments in the United Kingdom